Stingaree is a 1915 American drama film serial, set in Australia, directed by James W. Horne. It was followed by a sequel The Further Adventures of Stingaree.

Episodes
 An Enemy of Mankind (1915)
 A Voice in the Wilderness (1915)
 The Black Hole of Glenrenald (1915)
 To the Vile Dust (1915)
 A Bushranger at Bay (1915)
 The Taking of Stingaree (1915)
 The Honor of the Road (1916)
 The Purification of Mulfers (1916)
 The Duel in the Desert (1916)
 The Villain Worshipper (1916)
 The Moth and the Star (1916)
 The Darkest Hour (1916)

Cast
 True Boardman as Irving Randolph / Stingaree
 Marin Sais as Ethel Porter
 Paul Hurst as Howie (as Paul C. Hurst)
 Thomas G. Lingham as Guy Kentish
 Frank Jonasson as Inspector Kilbride / Vanheimert / Governor / Bishop Methuen
 William Brunton as Robert randolph
 James W. Horne as Oswald
 Ollie Kirby as Mrs. Green (as Ollie Kirkby)
 Edward Clisbee as Sergeant Cameron / Chaplain / John Trent / Trooper Bowen
 Joseph Barber as Inspector
 Jack Lott
 Hoot Gibson
 Janet Rambeau

See also
 Hoot Gibson filmography

References

External links

Stingaree at AustLit
The Further Adventures of Stingaree at AustLit

1915 films
1915 drama films
American silent serial films
American black-and-white films
Silent American drama films
Films directed by James W. Horne
Films based on Australian novels
Films set in colonial Australia
Bushranger films
1910s American films